Keith E. Stanovich is a Canadian psychologist. He is an Emeritus Professor of Applied Psychology and Human Development at the University of Toronto and former Canada Research Chair of Applied Cognitive Science. His research areas are the psychology of reasoning and the psychology of reading. His research in the field of reading was fundamental to the emergence of today's scientific consensus about what reading is, how it works, and what it does for the mind. His research on the cognitive basis of rationality has been featured in the journal Behavioral and Brain Sciences and in recent books by Yale University Press and University of Chicago Press. His book What Intelligence Tests Miss won the 2010 Grawemeyer Award in Education. He received the 2012 E. L. Thorndike Career Achievement Award from the American Psychological Association.

Academic career

Stanovich has done extensive research on reading, language disabilities, and the psychology of rational thought. His classic article on the Matthew effect in education has been cited over 1,000 times in the scientific literature.  He is the author of over 175 scientific articles, several of which have become Current Contents Citation Classics. Stanovich coined the term dysrationalia to refer to the tendency toward irrational thinking and action despite adequate intelligence. In several recent books, he has explored the concept as well as the relation between rationality and intelligence. In his book The Rationality Quotient: Toward a Test of Rational Thinking, Stanovich and colleagues follow through on the claim that a comprehensive test of rational thinking is scientifically possible, given current knowledge.

In a three-year survey of citation rates during the mid-1990s, Stanovich was listed as one of the fifty most-cited developmental psychologists. He has also been named one of the 25 most productive educational psychologists. In a citation survey of the period 1982–1992, he was designated the most cited reading disability researcher in the world.

Stanovich is also a fellow of the Committee for Skeptical Inquiry.

Awards

Stanovich is the only two-time winner of the Albert J. Harris Award from the International Reading Association for influential articles on reading. In 1995, he was elected to the Reading Hall of Fame as the youngest member of that honorary society. In 1996, he was given the Oscar Causey Award from the National Reading Conference for contributions to research and in 1997, he received the Sylvia Scribner Award from the American Educational Research Association. In 2000, he received the Distinguished Scientific Contribution Award from the Society for the Scientific Study of Reading. He was awarded the 2010 Grawemeyer Award for Education from the University of Louisville and was selected as a 2010 Grawemeyer Award winner for his 2009 book, What Intelligence Tests Miss: The Psychology of Rational Thought. Stanovich is a Fellow of the American Psychological Association (Divisions 3 [experimental], 7 [developmental], 8 [Personality & Social], & 15 [Educational]), the American Psychological Society, the International Academy for Research in Learning Disabilities, and is a Charter Member of the Society for the Scientific Study of Reading. He was a member of the Committee on the Prevention of Reading Difficulties in Young Children of the National Research Council/National Academy of Sciences.  From 1986 to 2000, he was the associate editor of Merrill-Palmer Quarterly, a leading journal of human development.

Publications

See also
 Cognitive miser
 Great Rationality Debate

References

External links
 
 Keith Stanovich's page at the University of Toronto
 How reading works and what it does for the mind, an interview with Keith Stanovich
 

Living people
Year of birth missing (living people)
Dyslexia researchers
Canada Research Chairs
Academic staff of the University of Toronto
University of Michigan alumni
Developmental psychologists
21st-century American psychologists
Fellows of the American Psychological Association